The 2016 United States House of Representatives elections in South Carolina were held on November 8, 2016, to elect the seven U.S. representatives from the state of South Carolina, one from each of the state's seven congressional districts. The elections coincided with the 2016 U.S. presidential election, as well as other elections to the House of Representatives, elections to the United States Senate and various state and local elections. The primaries were held on June 14.

Overview

District 1

The 1st district is located on the Atlantic coastal plain, from Seabrook Island to the border with North Carolina and includes most of Charleston and Myrtle Beach. The incumbent is Republican Mark Sanford, who has represented the district since 2013, and previously from 1995 to 2001. The Democratic, Working Families and Green Party nominee is Dimitri Cherny.  The district has a PVI of R+11.

Republican primary

General election

Results

District 2

The 2nd district is located in central South Carolina and spans from Columbia to the South Carolina side of the Augusta, Georgia metropolitan area. The incumbent is Republican Joe Wilson, who has represented the district since 2001. The Democratic and Green Party nominee is Arik Bjorn.  The district has a PVI of R+16.

Democratic primary

General election

Results

District 3

The 3rd district is located in western South Carolina. The incumbent is Republican Jeff Duncan, who has represented the district since 2011. The district has a PVI of R+18.

General election

Results

District 4

The 4th district is located in Upstate South Carolina. The incumbent is Republican Trey Gowdy, who has represented the district since 2011. The district has a PVI of R+15.

After Gowdy declined to run for House Majority Leader following the announcement of the resignation of Speaker of the House John Boehner, in 2015, John Fleming, a Republican Congressman from Louisiana, told reporters that Gowdy would not run for reelection in 2016. Gowdy's office denied the report, and said that Gowdy had "every intention" of running in 2016.

In the November 2016 election, Gowdy faces Democrat Chris Fedalei, a  26-year-old attorney who has never held elected office.

General election

Results

District 5

The 5th district is located in northern South Carolina. The incumbent is Republican Mick Mulvaney, who has represented the district since 2011. The district has a PVI of R+9.

Republican primary

General election

Results

District 6

The 6th district is located in central and southern South Carolina. The incumbent is Democrat Jim Clyburn, who has represented the district since 1993. The Green Party nominee is Prince Charles Mallory. The district has a PVI of D+21.

General election

Results

District 7

The 7th district is located in northeastern South Carolina. The incumbent is Republican Tom Rice, who has represented this district since 2013. The Democratic and Green Party candidate is Mal Hynam. The district has a PVI of R+7.

General election

Results

References

External links
U.S. House elections in South Carolina, 2016 at Ballotpedia
Campaign contributions at OpenSecrets

2016
United States House
South Carolina